The Qingling Taga (庆铃达咖) is a pickup truck manufactured since 2017 by Qingling Motors.

Overview

The Taga is the first pickup truck of the Qingling brand, with technology heavily based on the Isuzu D-Max due to the cooperation between Isuzu and Qingling Motors in the Chinese market.

The interior of the Taga features a 8-inch color display that supports navigation, Bluetooth, Wi-Fi and mobile connectivity, reverse camera, voice control, and an optional onboard camera.

The cargo bed of the Taga is 1800 mm long, 1540 mm wide and 480 mm deep. The cargo bed is 850 mm above the ground.

Specifications
The Qingling Taga is powered by an Isuzu-sourced 4KH1 series 3.0-litre diesel engine producing 131 hp and 280N·m mated to a 5-speed manual transmission. The Taga is available as  2-wheel-drive model and 4-wheel-drive models with the crew cab as the only body style offered.

Qingling Taga H
A variant called the Qingling Taga H was launched in January 2021. The Qingling Taga H was positioned as a more upmarket and premium model compared to the regular Taga. The Qingling Taga H is powered by a 1.8-litre turbo gasoline engine producing 231 hp and 310N·m and a 3.0-litre turbo diesel engine producing 143 hp and 320N·m. Both engines are mated to a 5-speed manual transmission.

The Qingling Taga H features a redesigned front end and slightly revised rear. The interior is fully revamped compared to the regular Taga. The infotainment system supports Apple CarPlay and Baidu CarLife.

References

External links

Qingling Taga on Autohome
Qingling Taga H on Autohome

Pickup trucks
Rear-wheel-drive vehicles
All-wheel-drive vehicles
Cars introduced in 2017
Cars of China